Phosphoric acid (orthophosphoric acid, monophosphoric acid or phosphoric(V) acid) is a colorless, odorless phosphorus-containing solid, and inorganic compound with the chemical formula . It is commonly encountered as an 85% aqueous solution, which is a colourless, odourless, and non-volatile syrupy liquid. It is a major industrial chemical, being a component of many fertilizers.

The compound is an acid. Removal of all three  ions gives the phosphate ion . Removal of one or two protons gives dihydrogen phosphate ion , and the hydrogen phosphate ion , respectively. Phosphoric acid forms esters, called organophosphates.

The name "orthophosphoric acid" can be used to distinguish this specific acid from other "phosphoric acids", such as pyrophosphoric acid. Nevertheless, the term "phosphoric acid" often means this specific compound; and that is the current IUPAC nomenclature.

Production
 
Phosphoric acid is produced industrially by one of two routes, wet processes and dry.

Wet process 
In the wet process, a phosphate-containing mineral such as calcium hydroxyapatite and fluorapatite are treated with sulfuric acid.

Calcium sulfate (gypsum) is a by-product, which is removed as phosphogypsum. The hydrogen fluoride (HF) gas is streamed into a wet (water) scrubber producing hydrofluoric acid. In both cases the phosphoric acid solution usually contains 23–33%  P2O5 (32–46% ). It may be concentrated to produce commercial- or merchant-grade phosphoric acid, which contains about 54–62%  (75–85% ). Further removal of water yields superphosphoric acid with a  concentration above 70% (corresponding to nearly 100% ). The phosphoric acid from both processes may be further purified by removing compounds of arsenic and other potentially toxic impurities.

Dry process
To produce food-grade phosphoric acid, phosphate ore is first reduced with coke in an electric arc furnace, to give elemental phosphorus. Silica is also added, resulting in the production of calcium silicate slag. Elemental phosphorus is distilled out of the furnace and burned with air to produce high-purity phosphorus pentoxide, which is dissolved in water to make phosphoric acid.

Properties

Acidic properties
In aqueous solution phosphoric acid behaves as a triprotic acid.
, pKa1 = 2.14 
, pKa2 = 7.20
, pKa3 = 12.37
The difference between successive pKa values is sufficiently large so that salts of either monohydrogen phosphate,  or dihydrogen phosphate, can be prepared from a solution of phosphoric acid by adjusting the pH to be mid-way between the respective pK values.

Eutectic system
The phase diagram of the  system is complicated. Solutions up to 62.5%  are eutectic, exhibiting freezing-point depression as low as -85°C. Beyond this freezing-point increases, reaching 21°C by 85%  (w/w) and a local maximum at 91.6% which corresponds to the hemihydrate 2H3PO4•H2O, freezing at 29.32°C. There is a second smaller eutectic depression at a concentration of 94.75% which will not freeze down to 23.5°C. At higher concentrations the freezing point rapidly increases. Concentrated phosphoric acid tends to supercool before crystallization occurs, and may be relatively resistant to crystallisation even when stored below the freezing point. For many industrial uses 85% represents a practical upper limit, where higher concentrations risk the entire mass freezing solid when transported inside of tankers and having to be melted out, although some crystallisation can still occur in sub-zero temperatures.

Self condensation
Phosphoric acid is commercially available as aqueous solutions of various concentrations, not usually exceeding 85%. If concentrated further it undergoes slow self-condensation, forming an equilibrium with pyrophosphoric acid:

Even at 90% concentration the amount of pyrophosphoric acid present is negligible, but beyond 95% it starts to increase, reaching 15% at what would have otherwise been 100% orthophosphoric acid.

Due to the self-condensation, pure orthophosphoric acid can only be obtained by a careful fractional freezing/melting process. As the concentration is increased higher acids are formed, culminating in the formation of polyphosphoric acids. It is not possible to fully dehydrate phosphoric acid to phosphorus pentoxide, instead the polyphosphoric acid becomes increasingly polymeric and viscous.

Uses

The dominant use of phosphoric acid is for fertilizers, consuming approximately 90% of production.

Food-grade phosphoric acid (additive E338) is used to acidify foods and beverages such as various colas and jams, providing a tangy or sour taste. The phosphoric acid also serves as a preservative. Soft drinks containing phosphoric acid, which would include Coca-Cola, are sometimes called phosphate sodas or phosphates. Phosphoric acid in soft drinks has the potential to cause dental erosion. Phosphoric acid also has the potential to contribute to the formation of kidney stones, especially in those who have had kidney stones previously.

Specific applications of phosphoric acid include:
 in anti-rust treatment by phosphate conversion coating or passivation
 to prevent iron oxidation by means of the Parkerization process
 as an external standard for phosphorus-31 nuclear magnetic resonance
 in phosphoric acid fuel cells
 in activated carbon production
 in compound semiconductor processing, to etch Indium gallium arsenide selectively with respect to indium phosphide
 in microfabrication to etch silicon nitride selectively with respect to silicon dioxide
 in microfabrication to etch aluminum
 as a pH adjuster in cosmetics and skin-care products
 as a sanitizing agent in the dairy, food, and brewing industries

Safety 
Phosphoric acid is not a strong acid. However, at moderate concentrations phosphoric acid solutions are irritating to the skin. Contact with concentrated solutions can cause severe skin burns and permanent eye damage.

A link has been shown between long-term regular cola intake and osteoporosis in later middle age in women (but not men).

See also
 Phosphate fertilizers, such as ammonium phosphate fertilizers

References

Cited sources

External links

 National pollutant inventory – Phosphoric acid fact sheet
 NIOSH Pocket guide to chemical hazards

Mineral acids
Flavors
Food acidity regulators
Glassforming liquids and melts
Phosphates
Phosphorus oxoacids
Hydrogen compounds
Acid catalysts
E-number additives
Phosphorus(V) compounds